Lego Battles  is a LEGO video game developed by Hellbent Games and co-published by Warner Bros. Interactive Entertainment and TT Games Publishing. It was released on June 9, 2009, for the Nintendo DS. There are a total of three different stories in the game with six different quests and 15 different levels in each quest, with the option of playing as the protagonists or the antagonists of each story (similar to the hero and villain campaigns in LEGO Batman: The Videogame).  Quests are divided into three acts, each ranging in length of 4-6 levels. The game is based on the buildable toy lines of Lego themes such as Castle, Pirates, and Space themes.

Gameplay

Maps
There are 12 maps in the game that can be unlocked and bought for use in free-play mode. There are 4 of each types of map (the types being Mars, coast/island, and forest/grassland). However, there is no "random map" function, as in many other war-based strategy games. There are also a number of maps of all types which do not need to be unlocked at the start of the game. Each map features a different arrangement of 4 types of terrain: grass, dirt/rock, water/acid, and cliff. Each map also contains trees on certain parts of the grass. Mine seams are located in certain positions on the dirt. Buildings can only be built on grass, except for mines, which must be built on dirt-based mine seams; docks which must be built on dirt/water boundaries (the coast); and bridges that are built between bridge slots across the water. Water is impassable to all units except for transports and some specials. Cliffs are impassable to all units. Some water-based specials can't pass over dirt and grass, either.

Freeplay mode
The game also includes a free-play mode, in which the player can customize the units in their army, choose the map, and pick certain other settings, such as game mode and starting bricks. Both the characters/units and maps must be unlocked and bought with the in-game "LEGO studs" that famously appear in other Lego video games.

Plot
The main game is split into three stories based on classic Lego themes: Castle, Pirates, and Space.

The Kingdoms Story focuses on the King, his knights, and the allied dwarves battling the Skeleton Army led by the Evil Wizard trying to revive his deceased wife.

The Pirates story focuses on the struggle between Captain Brickbeard's crew trying to find a massive amount of treasure & the Imperial Navy led by Governor Broadside with assistance from the Ninja Master & his clan of ninjas, trying to thwart their plans.

The Space story focuses on a group of Astronauts colonizing a planet for its abundance of natural resources, defending it from Aliens who need the resources to get home, and deal with space pirates along the way. The player is also given the option to play as the enemy in each story as well, offering 6 stories in total, and 24 acts, and 25 heroes (including the 6 hidden heroes) to play with & use.

Reception

Lego Battles received "mixed or average" reviews, according to review aggregator Metacritic.

Sequel
On 12 April 2011, a follow-up for the Nintendo DS was released entitled Lego Battles: Ninjago, based on the Lego Ninjago toy line.

References

External links
 Official website

2009 video games
Battles
Multiplayer and single-player video games
Nintendo DS games
Nintendo DS-only games
Real-time strategy video games
Video games developed in Canada
Warner Bros. video games
Hellbent Games games